Azofra is a municipality in the Autonomous Community of La Rioja, Spain.

Etymology 
The name Azofra appeared in 1199, in a papal bull that conceded privileges to the Monastery of San Millán de la Cogolla. According to Asín, it derives from the Arabic as-suxra, "the tribute", that would record the form in which someone obtained property or the function discharged.

References 

Municipalities in La Rioja (Spain)